The Jefferson School is a historic school at 200 Middle Street in Weymouth, Massachusetts.  The Queen Anne style school was designed by Shepard S. Woodcock and was built in 1889.  The four-room schoolhouse is a variant of the Washington School, built in 1887.  In contrast to the latter school, this one has more symmetrical massing, but is decorated with scalloped shingles and a porch with elaborate woodwork.  It is topped by an octagonal clock tower with cupola.

The building was listed on the National Register of Historic Places in 1981.

See also
National Register of Historic Places listings in Norfolk County, Massachusetts

References

Buildings and structures in Weymouth, Massachusetts
Historic district contributing properties in Massachusetts
National Register of Historic Places in Norfolk County, Massachusetts
Queen Anne architecture in Massachusetts
School buildings on the National Register of Historic Places in Massachusetts
Schools in Norfolk County, Massachusetts